Vestre Kirkegård may refer to:

 Vestre Cemetery (Aarhus), Denmark
 Vestre Cemetery (Copenhagen), Denmark

See also
 Vestre gravlund, Oslo, Norway